Rezayat Group is a group of companies which are headquartered in Al-Khobar, Saudi Arabia. Originally called Ali Reza Group, it was founded by Abdullah Alireza in 1949 in the British Protectorate of Kuwait. The Rezayat Group is active in the industries of oil & gas, water, power generation, engineering and transportation with over 16,000 employees and operations in 13 countries. It is a family owned business descended from the House of Alireza trading family.

History 
Abdullah Alireza was a member of the prominent House of Alireza merchant family with trading interests in the Gulf and India. Abdullah was educated in Bombay and began his career as the secretary for Karl Twitchell, Director of the Saudi Arabian Mining Syndicate. Twitchell had previously been the local representative of California-Arabian Standard Oil Company (CASOC), one of the four partners which in May 1933 created what is now Saudi Aramco

Abdullah became liaison officer for CASOC, serving His Majesty King AbdulAziz as an interpreter, most notably at the historic ceremony in Dhahran on 1 May 1939, when the King turned the wheel to load the first shipment of Saudi oil. During a trip to Iran during the Second World War, Abdullah was asked to join the Allied administration with responsibility for the distribution of essential foodstuffs and supplies throughout the country.

On a visit to Kuwait in 1949, Abdullah saw opportunities to develop business in the Kuwait-Saudi Arabia Neutral Zone. He decided to base the Group in Kuwait, and with the help of his sons, Teymour and Fahd, steadily expanded its operations into other Gulf states, in addition to Saudi Arabia, where the Group's headquarters are now located. The Group built up important relationships with major Western and Asian contractors and industrial companies, which provided not just a solid foundation for its growth in the Middle East, but also a springboard for its expansion into other continents.

The group was known as the Ali Reza Group until 2005 but since this caused confusion with a similarly named Reza Group in Jeddah it was decided to use the name Rezayat in order to give a distinct identity.

Activities 
The Rezayat Group consists of 25 companies:

 15 wholly owned
 10 joint ventures
 Over 16,000 employees

Group activities 
 Trading
 Manufacturing
 Construction, Contracting and Engineering
 Industrial Services
 Logistics & Transportation
 Catering & Facilities Management
 Finance
 Insurance & Risk Management
 IT & Telecommunications

Primary target markets
 Oil, Gas and Petrochemicals
 Water
 Electricity
 Finance
 Information Technology

Logo and identity
The company logo is four blue colored letter "A"'s which represents the first letters of the founders name and also symbolizes the oil drill heads which were to be found in Saudi Arabia.

Each company within the group has its own identity and branding.

See also
 List of companies of Saudi Arabia

References

External links
 Rezayat Group website

1949 establishments in Kuwait
Conglomerate companies established in 1949
Companies of Saudi Arabia
Companies based in Khobar